General Sir Robert Percy Douglas, 4th Baronet (29 August 1805 – 30 September 1891) was a British Army officer who became Lieutenant Governor of Jersey.

Early life
The son of General Sir Howard Douglas, 3rd Baronet, Douglas was educated at High Wycombe Royal Grammar School. As the last surviving son of his father, he succeeded to the Baronetcy in 1861.

Military career
He was commissioned into the British Army in 1819 and rose to become colonel of 2nd Battalion of the Prince of Wales's (North Staffordshire) Regiment. He was Lieutenant Governor of Jersey from 1860 to 1863 and then for 5 years Lieutenant-Governor of the Cape of Good Hope, when he held the local rank of lieutenant general.

He was given the colonelcy of the 98th (The Prince of Wales's) Regiment of Foot from 1864 until the regiment merged with the 64th Regiment of Foot in 1881 to form The Prince of Wales's (North Staffordshire Regiment). He was then colonel of the 2nd Battalion in the new regiment until his death. He was promoted full general on 22 May 1874.

A daughter, Ann Penelope Harriet (1852–1927), married Sir Hugh Low at Bradford, Somerset, in 1885, and his third son was Sir Arthur Percy Douglas, 5th Baronet, Under-Secretary for Defence, New Zealand.

General Robert Percy Douglas died on 30 September 1891 aged 87 at The Hurst, his residence in Bournemouth.

A£1 coin featuring the Percy Douglas, a three-masted ship, was issued in his memory.

The town of Douglas, situated near the confluence of the Orange and Vaal Rivers in the Northern Cape province of South Africa is named after him.

References

British Army generals
Knights Bachelor
1805 births
1891 deaths
People educated at the Royal Grammar School, High Wycombe
29th Regiment of Foot officers
Baronets in the Baronetage of Great Britain
Governors of Jersey